5 Squadron SAAF was a South African Air Force Fighter / Fighter-Bomber squadron during World War II. It was disbanded at the end of the war and was re-commissioned in 1950. It remained active until 2 October 1992, when it was disbanded; its Atlas Cheetah E aircraft were also decommissioned.

History
The squadron was initially designated as a fighter-bomber unit and formed in Cape Town in April 1939. It was only active for eight months and was disbanded in December that year. It was re-formed on 7 May 1941 as a fighter squadron operating from Zwartkop Air Station equipped with Mohawk Vs. It deployed to Egypt in December 1941 re-equipped with Tomahawk IIBs.

The squadron was initially tasked with providing anti-shipping patrols and subsequently deployed as a fighter squadron over the Western Desert battlefield area. At the end of 1942 it received Kittyhawk IIIs and later Kittyhawk IVs and began to specialize in the ground-attack role, although still being retained as an ordinary fighter squadron as required. After the cessation of hostilities in Africa, the squadron moved to Malta to support the invasion of Sicily, after which it moved to that island and then on to mainland Italy. By the time the squadron was deployed to Italy, it was used only in the ground attack role.

While deployed to Italy, the squadron flew close air support and fighter-bomber missions, some over Yugoslavia. The squadron took part in the battles on the Sangro River, Monte Cassino and the Gustav and Gothic Lines. The Kittyhawks were replaced by Mustang IIIs (and later Mustang IVs) and these aircraft were retained until the end of the war in Italy when the squadron was disbanded.

5 Squadron was re-formed in Durban in December 1950 as an 'Active Citizen Force' unit flying Harvards. It was re-equipped with Impala Mk Is in July 1973 and Impala Mk IIs in early 1981. The squadron then moved to AFB Louis Trichardt to be equipped with Cheetah Es. It was finally disbanded on 2 October 1992 when its Cheetah aircraft were decommissioned.

Aircraft

See also
List of World War II aces from South Africa

References

Citations

External links
 

Squadrons of the South African Air Force
SAAF5
Military units and formations established in 1939
Military units and formations disestablished in 1992